Helston Water is a hamlet northwest of Carnon Downs in Cornwall, England. It is in the civil parish of Kea

References

Hamlets in Cornwall